Coronel Martínez de Hoz is a city located in the partido of Lincoln in Buenos Aires Province, Argentina.

The settlement was established in 1904 and named in honour of Miguel Federico Martínez de Hoz an Argentine colonel during the Paraguayan War.

Populated places in Buenos Aires Province
Populated places established in 1904
Lincoln, Buenos Aires
Cities in Argentina
Argentina